Auchenmade railway station was a railway station approximately  north-east of Kilwinning on the B707, North Ayrshire, Scotland. It served the hamlet of Auchentiber and the surrounding rural area as part of the Lanarkshire and Ayrshire Railway.

Infrastructure 
The OS maps of 1896 and 1910 show a substantial infrastructure with a double-track mainline and four sidings running off to a loading dock and a goods shed with a crane, a signal box at the far end of the southern end of the eastern platform, signal posts, weighing machine, pedestrian overbridge and several platform buildings. In 1946 the main platform buildings were still substantially intact.

Until around 1909, the Auchenmade Quarry and Brickworks company operated a private siding here. The old clay quarry near South Auchenmade Farm is now flooded; little evidence of the brickworks and associated railway sidings remains.

Lissens Goods was the next railway site, a goods station, down the line towards Ardrossan, supervised by staff at Auchenmade  Station and closed on 30 March 1953. Railway workers' cottages, similar to those at Auchenmade, still survive at Lissens.

The sidings operated at Lylestone Quarry were supervised by staff from Auchenmade Station.

Goods trains ran along this line until 30 March 1953, however in 1958 the sidings were still present.

History 

The station opened on 3 September 1888. It closed between 1 January 1917 and 2 March 1919 due to wartime economy, and closed permanently on 4 July 1932. Boat trains to Ardrossan ran along this line until 1939.

Opened by the Lanarkshire and Ayrshire Railway, then joining the Caledonian Railway it became part of the London Midland and Scottish Railway during the Grouping of 1923. It was then closed by that company.

A feature of World War II was the use of the line for what locals called the night time 'ghost trains' that carried injured service personnel to the Glasgow hospitals from where they had been landed at the port of Ardrossan.

The site today

The platforms of Auchenmade station remain intact today as do the railway workers' cottages and the loading dock. The railway fencing and gate survives however the bridge abutments have been removed.

References

Notes

Sources 
 
 
Wham, Alasdair (2013). Ayrshire's Forgotten Railways. A Walker's Guide. Cranborne : Oakwood Press. .
 Station on navigable O.S. map

External links 

 Auchenmade Railway Station & Workers Cottages
 Lissens Sidings
 RAILSCOT on Lanarkshire and Ayrshire Railway 

Disused railway stations in North Ayrshire
Former Caledonian Railway stations
Railway stations in Great Britain opened in 1888
Railway stations in Great Britain closed in 1917
Railway stations in Great Britain opened in 1919
Railway stations in Great Britain closed in 1932